The Gypsy Bride is a Spanish television series directed by Paco Cabezas adapting the novel of the same name by Carmen Mola that began airing on 25 September 2022. It stars Nerea Barros as the lead character Inspector Elena Blanco.

Plot 
Set in the heart of the Spanish Romani community, the fiction follows police inspector Elena Blanco and her team, as they try to crack the crime case pertaining to the murders of sisters Lara and Susana Macaya, separated by a 7-year gap.

Cast

Production 
The series was produced by ViacomCBS International Studios alongside Atresmedia Televisión and Diagonal TV (Banijay Iberia). The series is an adaptation of the novel La novia gitana by Carmen Mola, a penname for Agustín Martínez, Jorge Díaz and Antonio Mercero. José Rodríguez and Antonio Mercero (coordinators) took over writing duties alongside Jorge Díaz and Susana Martín Gijón. Shooting began in January 2022. It will consist of 8 episodes featuring a running time of around 50 minutes.

Release 
Prior to its streaming release, the first episode screened at the 70th San Sebastián International Film Festival. The first two episodes debuted in Spain on Atresplayer Premium on 25 September 2021.

Accolades 

|-
| rowspan = "2" align = "center" | 2023 || rowspan = "2" | 10th Feroz Awards || Best Actress in a TV Series || Nerea Barros ||  || rowspan = "2" | 
|-
| Best Supporting Actor in a TV Series || Vicente Romero || 
|}

References 

Television series based on Spanish novels
2022 Spanish television series debuts
2020s Spanish drama television series
Atresplayer Premium original programming
Spanish-language television shows
Spanish crime television series
Spanish mystery television series